Abdi Haybe Lambad is a veteran Somali comedian actor and one of the most noted comedians in Somali cinema. Lambad was one of the first Somali stand-up comedians in the Horn of Africa. He currently resides in Sweden. He hails from the Abokor Issa subdivision of the Issa Musse subclan of the Habr Awal Isaaq.

References

Somalian comedians
Living people
21st-century Somalian people
People from Hargeisa
Year of birth missing (living people)